"The West Virginia Hills" is one of four of West Virginia's state songs.

History

"The West Virginia Hills" was written in 1879 as a poem inspired by the scenery surrounding the Glenville area and put to music in 1885 by Henry Everett Engle. The song was made one of West Virginia's state songs on February 3, 1961.

While the original poem is traditionally credited to Ellen Ruddell King, it is believed by some that the lyrics were in fact written by her husband, the Reverend David King.

Lyrics

References

External links

First Verse and Chorus by R.J. Nestor

Songs about West Virginia
West Virginia